Torsten Lindström (born September 6, 1974) is a Swedish Christian democratic politician, member of the Riksdag 2002–2006.

References

Members of the Riksdag from the Christian Democrats (Sweden)
Living people
1974 births
Members of the Riksdag 2002–2006
Place of birth missing (living people)